Khalid Ali Mia (21 February 1932 – 2 April 1981) was a Bangladesh Awami League politician. He was elected a member of parliament from Undivided Rajshahi-2 in 1973. He was one of the organizers of the Liberation War of Bangladesh.

Early life and education 
Khaled Ali Miah was born on 21 February 1932 in Bangabari Union under Gomstapur upazila of Chapainawabganj district. His father's name is Yunus Ali Mia and mother's name is Rabeya Begum. Yunus Ali Mia has three sons and two daughters. Khaled Ali Miah is the eldest of the sons. Khalid Ali Mia's primary education started at home. He learned Arabic, Persian, Urdu and Bengali from home teachers. He was later admitted to a rural school named Banggabari primary school in his village. In 1939 he was admitted in the six class of Molda Zilla School. It is the oldest school at Malda district, West Bengal, India. He was continuing his education until class eight in this school. After the Partition of  India and Pakistan, he left India and was admitted at class eight in Rajshahi Collegiate School. After passing the Matriculation examination, he was admitted at Rajshahi College in the science section. After competition for higher secondary education he was admitted to Dhaka Medical College for MBBS degree. He was suffering asthma from his childhood, and he could not continue his medical education. As a result he changed to B.A. (Hons) general history at Rajshahi University. From here he completed his education at general history B.A. (Hons) and M.A. He prepared to go to Britain to study barrister after passing BA Honors, M, A (History). But due to political and family reasons it was not possible for him to go to study barristery.

Career 
Political life: Khaled Ali Mia has been involved in student politics since his student days. He always acted as the guardian of the helpless, oppressed, neglected students. He used to jump with the students in various movements and struggles. He played a leading role in the 52 language movement. It may be mentioned here that he was one of the students who struggled for the establishment of Rajshahi University.

Contribution to the war of liberation: Khaled Ali Mia is said to be one of the organizers of the liberation war. When Bangabandhu called for the independence movement, he organized the people of Rahanpur, Bangabari, Alinagar and Boalia to go to war and arranged training for all. That is why Alinagar Bangbari and Boaliai have the highest number of freedom fighters. The freedom fighters said that it was the contribution of Khaled Ali Mia to organize everyone in the liberation war. A new generation of people gathered to hear the story of Khaled Ali Mia in the mouths of all the freedom fighters who are still alive.

Khaled Ali Miah was elected to the Awami League in the 1970 general elections in Pakistan and was elected member of national assembly (MNA) from Chapainawabganj. Khaled Ali Mia made great strides in the field of education after being elected MNA. He established Yunus Swarani High School (now known as Yunus Ali Smarani School and College) in 1969 in memory of his father Yunus Ali in the neglected Bangabari Union. He was then the chairman of the Union Parishad. In order to ensure that the people of Barind are not deprived of education, Khaled Ali Miah Multipurpose High School was established in 1960 at Baradadpur in the remote Parbatipur Union. Then in 1973, in the first parliamentary election of Bangladesh, he was elected Member of Parliament of Bangladesh Awami League in Rajshahi-2 constituency. At this time he established Rahannpur Rabeya Girls' High School in the name of his mother. There was still no separate educational institution for girls in Rahanpur. Khaled Ali Mia also played a leading role in the establishment of Rahonpur Yusuf Ali College. He was a part-time head teacher at Rahanpur AB Government High School and Rahonpur Yusuf Ali College as a teacher of history. While teaching in both the institutions, he did not receive any allowance.

Death 
Khalid Ali Mia died on 2 April 1981.

References 

1932 births
1981 deaths
People from Chapai Nawabganj district
Awami League politicians
1st Jatiya Sangsad members